Mainetti is an Italian surname. Notable people with the surname include:

José María Mainetti (1909–2006), Argentine physician, surgeon and oncologist
Maria Laura Mainetti (1939–2000), Italian Catholic sister and murder victim
Stefano Mainetti (born 1957), Italian composer and conductor
Valter Mainetti (born 1947), Italian businessman
Veronica Mainetti (born 1978), Italian chief executive

Italian-language surnames